Yury Avanesovich Shakhmuradov (born 27 February 1942 in Jabrayil) is a retired Soviet  freestyle wrestler of Azerbaijani heritage. Senior world champion 1970 and 3x European champion. He competed in the men's freestyle 78 kg at the 1968 Summer Olympics. Also, he was a former head coach of the senior Russian women's national wrestling team (2012-2019).

References

External links
 

1942 births
Living people
Soviet male sport wrestlers
Olympic wrestlers of the Soviet Union
Wrestlers at the 1968 Summer Olympics
People from Jabrayil District